"The Champ" is a song by The Mohawks, a group of session musicians assembled by Alan Hawkshaw. It was originally released in 1968 but failed to chart. However, a re-release made #58 on the UK Singles Chart in 1987 after being sampled many times. The song is based on "Tramp", a 1967 Lowell Fulson record that was covered extensively after its release. The song chants the word "Tramp" rather than "Champ".

Sampled
The song is perhaps better known for its usage as a sample in over 700+ songs; it has been widely sampled and emulated in hip hop music including:

1980s
 Maestro Fresh-Wes – "Let Your Backbone Slide" (Symphony in Effect)
 Eric B. & Rakim – "Eric B. Is President" (Paid in Full)
 Stetsasonic – "Miami Bass" (In Full Gear)
 Afrika Bambaataa and James Brown - "Unity"
 Big Daddy Kane - "Smooth Operator"
 Guy - "Groove Me" (Guy)
 Guy – "Teddy's Jam" (Guy)
 EPMD – "The Big Payback (7" Remix)" (Unfinished Business)
 Afrika Bambaataa, Afrika Islam, and Jazzy Jay - "Fusion Beats Vol. 2"
 Original Concept - "Can You Feel It"
 Salt-n-Pepa - "Tramp"
 DJ Jazzy Jeff & The Fresh Prince - "Pump Up the Bass"
 MC Hammer - "Pump It Up"
 Mantronix - "Fresh Is the Word"
 DJ Chuck Chillout - "Hip Hop on Wax - Volume 1"
 Marley Marl - "The Man Marley Marl"
 Eazy-E - "Ruthless Villain"

1990s
 Ini Kamoze – "Here Comes the Hotstepper"
 Onyx – "Slam"
 Aaliyah - "Got to Give It Up"
 Lords of the Underground - "Chief Rocka"
 Keith Murray – "Get Lifted" (The Most Beautifullest Thing in This World)
 Erick Sermon – "Stay Real" (No Pressure)
 De La Soul – "Keepin' The Faith"
 Fu-Schnickens – "La Schmoove"
 Queen - "We Will Rock You (1991 Bonus Remix Ruined by Rick Rubin)"
 Looptroop Rockers – "Four Elements"
 Ice Cube – "Friday" (Friday soundtrack)
 Redman – "Da Funk" (Whut? Thee Album)
 KRS-One – "Step into a World (Rapture's Delight)"
 Cut Chemist & DJ Shadow – "Brainfreeze (Side 1)" (Brainfreeze)
 Son of Bazerk - "Change the Style"
 Breakestra – "Champ" (The Live Mix, Part 2)
 Foxy Brown – "Tramp" (Chyna Doll)
 Main Source – "Large Professor" (Breaking Atoms)
 King Tee – "At Your Own Risk (Budha Mix)" ("At Your Own Risk")
 DJ Shadow - "Lesson 4"
 Bahamadia - "3 Tha Hard Way"
 Mobb Deep - "Where Ya From"
 Delinquent Habits - "Lower Eastside"
 Marcelo D2 - "Baseado Em Fatos Reais"
 Jurassic 5 - "Unified Rebelution"
 Malchishnik - "Seks bez pereryva"

2000s
 Lloyd Banks – "On Fire"
 The Notorious B.I.G. - "Machine Gun Funk (DJ Premier Remix)"
 Bushido - "Von der Skyline zum Bordstein zurück"
 Edan – "Funky Rhyming"
 Pac Div - "Pac Div"
 Jaylib - "Ice"
 Q-Tip - "Let's Ride"
 Jaylib - "The Exclusive"
 Nas - "Where Are They Now (West Coast Remix)"

2010s
 Nicki Minaj - "Lookin Ass"
 Frank Ocean - "Nikes"
 Ab-Soul and Kendrick Lamar - "Turn Me Up"
 Lupe Fiasco - "Mission"
 Dino Lenny - "I'm Coming Home (Purple Disco Machine Remix)"
 Schoolboy Q - "Hoover Street"
 Janelle Monáe - "Sincerely, Jane."
 Method Man - "World Gone Sour (The Lost Kids)"
 Migos - "Stir Fry"
 Shai Linne - "Take Up and Read"
 French Montana - "Loyal"
 DJ Snake - "Quiet Storm"
 Logic - "Black SpiderMan"

2020s
 Brakence - "Cbd"
 Oklou - "Fall"

References

1968 singles
1968 songs
Sampling (music)